Christopher James Buck (born February 24, 1958) is an American film director, animator, and screenwriter known for co-directing Tarzan (1999), Surf's Up (2007) (which was nominated for the 2007 Oscar for Best Animated Feature), Frozen (2013), which won the Oscar for Best Animated Feature in 2014, and Frozen II (2019). He also worked as a supervising animator and story artist on Pocahontas (1995) and Home on the Range (2004).

He has won for one Academy Award, Annie Award and BAFTA Award, and has been nominated for two Academy, two BAFTA and five Annie Awards.

Life and career
A native of Wichita, Kansas, Buck was inspired to explore animation by the first film he ever saw in a movie theatre as a child: Pinocchio (1940).  His family eventually moved to Placentia, California, where he graduated from El Dorado High School.

Buck studied character animation for two years at CalArts, where he also taught from 1988 to 1993.  At CalArts, Buck became friends with both John Lasseter and Michael Giaimo. He began his career as an animator with Disney in 1978.

Besides his work as a co-director on Tarzan, Buck's other credits at Disney also include the 1995 animated feature Pocahontas, where he oversaw the animation of three central characters: Percy, Grandmother Willow, and Wiggins. Buck also helped design characters for the 1989 animated feature The Little Mermaid, performed experimental animation for The Rescuers Down Under (1990) and Who Framed Roger Rabbit (1988), and was an animator on The Fox and the Hound (1981) and The Black Cauldron (1985).

Buck helped develop several films at Hyperion Pictures and served as a directing animator on the feature Bébé's Kids. He storyboarded Tim Burton's live-action featurette Frankenweenie (1984) and worked with Burton again as directing animator on the Brad Bird-directed Family Dog episode of Steven Spielberg's Amazing Stories and as director of the subsequent primetime animated series.

Buck's credits include a number of animated commercials (including some with the Keebler Elves) for such Los Angeles-based production entities as FilmFair, Kurtz & Friends, and Duck Soup.

Buck went on to co-direct Surf's Up at Sony Pictures Animation, which was released in June 2007.

In 2008, Buck's old friend Lasseter, by then Disney Animation's chief creative officer, persuaded him to come back to Disney from Sony. Around September 2008, Buck pitched three ideas to Lasseter, one of which was a fairytale musical version of The Snow Queen; Lasseter liked the idea and authorized Buck to proceed with development.  After it was put on hold during 2010, the film was officially announced in December 2011 under the title Frozen, with a release date of November 27, 2013.  In turn, Buck persuaded Giaimo to come back to Disney to serve as the film's art director, for which Giaimo would go on to win the Annie Award for Best Production Design in an Animated Feature Production.

In September 2014, it was announced that Buck and Lee would co-direct a short film based on the Frozen characters called Frozen Fever. It was released in March 2015, alongside Cinderella.

On March 12, 2015, Disney announced that Buck and Lee would co-direct Frozen II, the sequel to Frozen. It was released in November 2019.

As of September 2022 Buck is directing Wish, scheduled for release in November 2023.

Personal life
Buck is married to Shelley  Rae Hinton Buck, an Emmy and Oscar Award winner in sound editing. They have three sons, Ryder, Woody, and Reed.

Their oldest son, Ryder, died at age 23 on October 27, 2013, in a car collision, when he was hit by two cars after his car broke down on the Glendale Freeway. Ryder was a singer and songwriter performing in his band Ryder Buck and the Breakers, and was recovering from a year-long battle with a Stage 4 testicular cancer. On March 2, 2014, upon accepting the Academy Award for Best Animated Feature for co-directing Frozen at the 86th Academy Awards, Buck dedicated the award to his son Ryder. The tragedy was an inspiration for the song "The Next Right Thing" in Frozen II, as well as a character named "Ryder."

Reed lent his voice to Arnold, a little penguin from Surf's Up, directed by his father.

Filmography

Feature films

Short films

Television

Documentaries

Accolades

References

External links

 

1958 births
Animators from Kansas
American animated film directors
Animation screenwriters
Living people
Artists from Wichita, Kansas
Annie Award winners
California Institute of the Arts alumni
California Institute of the Arts faculty
Film directors from Kansas
Sony Pictures Animation people
Walt Disney Animation Studios people
Directors of Best Animated Feature Academy Award winners